The Alpha Gamma Delta women's fraternity has installed approximately 200 collegiate chapters and 250 alumnae chapters across the United States and Canada. , there are 123 active chapters that have initiated approximately 197,000 members into the fraternity. This is a list of Alpha Gamma Delta chapters which includes undergraduate and alumnae chapters.

Alpha Gamma Delta's collegiate chapters are grouped and named by geographical region. Northeastern chapter designations begin with Alpha, Lambda, or Zeta, Midwest designations begin with Beta, and west coast chapters begin with Delta. Mid-south American chapters such as those in Texas or Oklahoma begin with Epsilon or Kappa, while most southern chapters are designated at Gamma, Nu, or Theta. The longest-running active collegiate chapter is Delta chapter at the University of Minnesota. However, since its reestablishment in 2010, the oldest active collegiate chapter is the Alpha chapter at Syracuse University. Alpha Gamma Delta is one of two sororities with a National Panhellenic chapter in the state of Hawaii.

In 1959 at the 22nd international convention, Alpha Gamma Delta absorbed Theta Sigma Upsilon, which added 13 chapters to the fraternity's roster.



Collegiate chapters 
The following sections include tables of the fraternity's chapters operating at universities. The initial sort order is alphabetically by state or province, though these tables may be sorted by university name, chapter designation, chapter status, or chapter charter year.

Canada 
Chapter information from the national website, Baird's Manual (20th), and the Baird's Manual Online Archive. Active chapters noted in bold, inactive chapters noted in italics.

United States 
Chapter information from the national website, Baird's Manual (20th), and the Baird's Manual Online Archive. Active chapters noted in bold, inactive chapters noted in italics.

Housing 
Housing for many of the chapters listed is managed by the Alpha Gamma Delta Fraternity Housing Corporation (FHC), a 501(c)(7) organization formed in 2010 to provide student housing for members of the fraternity. Currently, the FHC provides student housing or property management services to about 90 Alpha Gamma Delta chapters and about 100 staff members in the headquarters office and in local US chapters. Aside from housing, the FHC manages meal services for the members of the fraternity. It reported assets of $78 million USD in 2019.

Alumnae

Canada

United States

References

External links 
Alpha Gamma Delta collegiate chapter list
Alpha Gamma Delta alumnae chapter list

Alpha Gamma Delta
chapters